Saquarema is a municipality located in the Brazilian state of Rio de Janeiro. Its population is 90,583 (2020) and its area is 353,566 km². It is located almost 73 km east of Rio de Janeiro. It was known as Brazil's surfing capital.

During the mid-19th century, the Conservative Party and its leaders were known as "Saquarema" because of their base of support here.

The Surfing Capital

Saquarema, through its beaches, especially Itaúna Beach, is known as the Brazilian capital of surfing for its perfect waves and indescribable beauty and strength. In the 70's, Saquarema hosted the longing surfing festivals and in 2017, Saquarema became part of the world surfing circuit, with WSL.

References

External links
 Saquarema's town hall
 SaquaOnline - Unofficial website

Populated coastal places in Rio de Janeiro (state)
Municipalities in Rio de Janeiro (state)